The Northamptonshire Ironstone Railway  Trust operates a  long heritage railway line at Hunsbury Hill, south-west of Northampton. The line is mainly dedicated to freight working, featuring many sharp curves and steep gradients which were typical of the industrial railway, but rides are available in a variety of vehicles including a converted brake van.

Restoration
Operationally the railway has received full operating clearance from the HMRI to allow running on the relaid section of the 1st quarter of the mile of the route.

Locomotives

Steam
 "Belvedere" Sentinel geared vertical boilered tank engine No. 9365. Built in 1946. On static display.
 "Musketeer" Sentinel geared vertical boilered tank engine No. 6369. Built in 1946. On Static Display.
 Peckett and Sons  No. 2130. Built in 1951. Operational, returned to steam in 2016 at the Battlefield Line Railway and moved to NIRT in 2020.

Diesel
 Planet . No. 3967 - Operational.
 No. 2087 Hunslet Engine Company . Awaiting restoration.
 Hudswell Clarke  No. D697. Undergoing restoration.
 Ruston & Hornsby 88DS  No. 321730 "Mabel" - Used as a flatbed vehicle, chassis only.
 Ruston & Hornsby 88DS  No. 394014. Built in 1956 - Awaiting restoration.
 Fowler 0-4-0DH No. 4220001 "Charles Wake" built in 1959 – Operational.
 Fowler 0-4-0DE No. 4200016 "Flying Falcon". Built in 1962 - Undergoing overhaul 
 Fowler 0-4-0DH No. 4220022. Built in 1947 - Undergoing restoration.

Former Locomotives
"Waleswood" Hudswell Clarke  No. 750. Built in 1906. The locomotive was completely overhauled at the railway until 2019, when it left the railway on 1 September for the Chasewater Railway.

Rolling stock
B950061	20-ton LMS (BR-built) brake van – operational. Built in 1950 to an LMS design.
B490310	12-ton LNER (BR-built) open wagon. Built in 1952. 
M407942	12-ton LMS open wagon. Built in 1937.
321734	 Ex Ruston "88" underframe
No. 330	Nordberg trackmachine 	
Joseph Booth steam crane 
S56134 SR pillbox brake van
BR86803  BR GUV Mk1 converted to crane runner wagon

Multiple units

Electric
BR Class 411 4CEP TSO nos. 70284, 70296 and 70510 
BR Class 415 4EPB unit 5176  last surviving unrefurbished unit - reformed as 3EPB, Built in 1954.
BR Class 422 4BIG TRSB 69304 unit 2260
BR Class 4DD DMBC no. 13004 (formerly of unit 4002 later renumbered 4902 owing to the number 4002 being reallocated to the second British Rail Class 445) BR Green. Built in 1949.

References

External links
[see face book nirt]
 Northamptonshire Ironstone railway trust

Heritage railways in Northamptonshire
Railway museums in England
Museums in Northamptonshire